Georgia-Leigh Vele (born 11 December 1998) is a Papua New Guinean swimmer. She competed in the women's 100 metre freestyle at the 2019 World Aquatics Championships held in Gwangju, South Korea.

References

1998 births
Living people
Papua New Guinean female swimmers
Place of birth missing (living people)
Papua New Guinean female freestyle swimmers
Swimmers at the 2022 Commonwealth Games
Commonwealth Games competitors for Papua New Guinea